Professor William Hawkins Wilson (Oxford 1866 – Cairo 1956) was a British  physiologist and a member of the Faculty of Medicine, Cairo, Egypt, from 1895 to 1928, in which latter year he became Professor of physiology and dean of Kasr El Aini Hospital.  Professor Wilson contributed to the study of pellagra at the beginning of the 20th century.

References

1866 births
1956 deaths
British physiologists
20th-century British medical doctors
Academic staff of Cairo University
Egyptian physiologists
Qasr El Eyni Hospital